The 1994 Baltimore Orioles season was a season in American baseball. It involved the Orioles finishing 2nd in the American League East with a record of 63 wins and 49 losses. The season was cut short by the infamous 1994 player's strike.

Offseason
 December 14, 1993: Mark Eichhorn was signed as a free agent with the Baltimore Orioles.
 January 14, 1994: Chris Sabo was signed as a free agent by the Orioles.
 January 20, 1994: Lee Smith was signed as a free agent by the Orioles.
 February 3, 1994: Henry Cotto was signed as a free agent by the Orioles.

Regular season

By Friday August 12, 1994, when the MLB Players' strike began, the Orioles had scored 589 runs (5.26 per game) and allowed 497 runs (4.44 per game) with a 63–49 record through 112 games. They were 2.5 games behind the Cleveland Indians (66-47) in the 1994 AL Wildcard Race.

Because they had only played in 112 games by the time the strike began, the Orioles had the fewest at-bats in the Majors, with just 3,856. The Orioles pitching staff had good control, as the Orioles had the fewest wild pitches (18) in the Majors. They also tied the Seattle Mariners for the fewest balks, with just one. Orioles baserunners successfully stole 69 bases in the strike-shortened season and were caught stealing only 13 times: the fewest in the Majors. Their pitchers also had good control, with just 18 wild pitches thrown: the fewest in the Majors.

 August 2, 1994: Jeff Tackett hit a home run in the last at-bat of his career.

Notable transactions

Roster

Season standings

Record vs. opponents

Player stats

Batting

Starters by position 
Note: Pos = Position; G = Games played; AB = At bats; H = Hits; Avg. = Batting average; HR = Home runs; RBI = Runs batted in

Other batters 
Note: G = Games played; AB = At bats; H = Hits; Avg. = Batting average; HR = Home runs; RBI = Runs batted in

Pitching

Starting pitchers 
Note: G = Games pitched; IP = Innings pitched; W = Wins; L = Losses; ERA = Earned run average; SO = Strikeouts

Other pitchers 
Note: G = Games pitched; IP = Innings pitched; W = Wins; L = Losses; ERA = Earned run average; SO = Strikeouts

Relief pitchers 
Note: G = Games pitched; W = Wins; L = Losses; SV = Saves; ERA = Earned run average; SO = Strikeouts

Farm system

Notes

References
1994 Baltimore Orioles team page at Baseball Reference
1994 Baltimore Orioles season at baseball-almanac.com

Baltimore Orioles seasons
Baltimore Orioles season
Baltimore